Khandayat or Khandait is a landed militia caste from Odisha, East india. They were feudal chiefs, military generals, zamindars, large land holders and agriculturalists. During British raj, they ruled many tributary states in Odisha. They are largest caste by population in Odisha.

Etymology 
The name Khandayat is originated from the word "Khanda" which means Sword and khandayat means sword wielding.

According to G.Praharaj, in old days who came forward to save the native kingdom with their swords when it was in trouble were granted the title of "Khandayat". Since then people of Oda (Peasants) & Gauda (cowherds) castes enjoyed the title, it can be said khandayat is only a title.

Origin 
Rampant invasions took place in medieval period which prompted the Odia rulers to accumulate the large population of farmers and tribals into their army, such accumulation led to the emergence of Khandayat caste. Khandayat title was used by people of various communities and classes in medieval period for their participation in military activities. According to Das they originated from Oda & Gauda castes.

Classification

Khandayats were considered Shudras by the Brahmins of medieval period however rich Khandayats associate themselves with Kshatriya varna for upward mobility.

History

Medieval Odisha 
Early mention of Khandayats as feudal chief and military personnel is found during the rule of Eastern Ganga Dynasty. According to Odia historian K. N. Mohapatra, Khandayat strategies were established in Bhubaneswar and near by areas to protect the Lingaraja Temple. During the mediaeval period Khandayats received good amounts of agricultural lands from the kings and became local zamindars.
 
Fakir Mohan Senapati while Quoting Abul Fazal mentioned Khandayats as a landowning caste that dominated the politics and military of Gajapati Empire. Mughal chronicle Ain-i-Akbari gave a clear picture of Odisha after the broke down of Gajapati Empire. It mentioned about different forts ruled by Khandayat Zamindars along with their King Mukund Dev.

Modern Odisha 
British conquered Odisha in 1803 and started new land reforms to increase tax revenue. Khandayats enjoyed tax free lands in Khurda Kingdom in return for military services. British abolished these tax free jagirs which led to the Paika Rebellion of 1817. According to a land settlement report of 1897, they owned the highest number of Zamindaris in Odisha.

During British rule, some rich Adibasis, Chasas, and Agharias started identifying themselves as Khandayats in order to gain social status and Zamindari land rights in some princely states of west Odisha. The number of Khandayats increased 45.4% from 1901 to 1921, the highest of any caste.

Society and culture 
 

Khandayats were the land-owning & Socio-economically dominant caste in most of the villages of Odisha. In coastal Odisha Khandayats treat Brahmins as Priests, Service castes (washermen, barbers, herders etc.) as servants & untouchable castes as agricultural labourers. Such age old customs & dominance often lead to violence against marginalized castes and seen as customary bondage system.

References

Further reading 

Social groups of Odisha